The West Yangon General Hospital is a public hospital in Yangon, Myanmar. It consists of a medical ward, a surgical ward, a pediatric ward, and an obstetrics and gynecology ward. The hospital also runs an ER for general medicine, general surgery and traumatology. It is also the Tertiary Care Teaching Hospital of University of Medicine 1, Yangon, the Yangon Institute of Nursing, and the University of Paramedical Science, Yangon. The hospital mainly serves the masses who cannot afford to attend private hospitals in Yangon or go abroad for "medical tourism".

References

Hospital buildings completed in 1950
Hospitals in Yangon